The subdivisions of Georgia are autonomous republics (avtonomiuri respublika), regions (მხარე, mkhare), and municipalities (მუნიციპალიტეტი, munits'ipaliteti).

Georgia is a unitary state, whose borders are defined by the law as corresponding to the situation of 21 December 1991. It includes two autonomous republics (avtonomiuri respublika), those of Adjara and Abkhazia, the latter being outside Georgia's effective control. The former Soviet-era autonomous entity of South Ossetia is also not currently under Georgia's de facto jurisdiction, and has no final defined constitutional status in Georgia's territorial arrangement.

The territory of Georgia is currently subdivided into a total of 69 municipalities of which 5 are self-governing cities (ქალაქი, k'alak'i), including the nation's capital of Tbilisi, and 64 municipalities consisting of multiple urban or rural settlements which are grouped in administrative communities (თემი, t'emi) within the municipality. The municipalities outside the two autonomous republics and Tbilisi are grouped, on a provisional basis, into nine regions (mkhare): Guria, Imereti, Kakheti, Kvemo Kartli, Mtskheta-Mtianeti, Racha-Lechkhumi and Kvemo Svaneti, Samegrelo-Zemo Svaneti, Samtskhe-Javakheti, and Shida Kartli. Tbilisi itself is divided into ten districts (რაიონი, raioni).

Autonomous republics
The two autonomous republics, Abkhazia and Adjara, were established during the Soviet era and are recognized by the modern Constitution of Georgia adopted in 1995.

Adjara

Adjara is subdivided into 6 municipalities:
 The self-governing city of Batumi, which is the entity's capital;
 The self-governing municipality of Keda;
 The self-governing municipality of Kobuleti; 
 The self-governing municipality of Khelvachauri; 
 The self-governing municipality of Shuakhevi; 
 The self-governing municipality of Khulo.

Abkhazia

As a result of the military conflicts in 1992–1993 and 2008, Georgia has no effective control over Abkhazia, whose declaration of independence is recognized by Russia and three other UN member states. Georgia considers Abkhazia as its autonomous republic, whose government sits in exile in Tbilisi, and currently an occupied territory. Abkhazia's territory, in the Kodori Valley, which had been under Georgia's control prior to the Russo–Georgian War of 2008, is de jure the self-governing community of Azhara. Abkhazia's secessionist government divides the entity's territory into seven districts (raion).

South Ossetia

South Ossetia enjoyed the status of an autonomous oblast in the Soviet era. When Georgia became independent, South Ossetia covered four municipalities that are de jure in separate present-day Georgian regions (established only after 1994):  the eastern tip of Racha-Lechkhumi and Kvemo Svaneti, the north-east part of Imereti, the northern half of Shida Kartli, and the western part of Mtskheta-Mtianeti.

After the military conflicts in 1991–1992 and 2008, Georgia considers the former Autonomous Oblast of South Ossetia an occupied territory. Its status is not constitutionally defined by Georgia, but there is a Provisional Administration of South Ossetia sitting in exile in Tbilisi. The territory which had been under Georgia's control prior to the Russo–Georgian War of 2008, was organized into four municipalities, which retain their de jure status. South Ossetia's secessionist government divides the entity's territory into four districts (raion).

The laws of Georgia include a notion that the final subdivision and system of local self-government should be established after the restoration of the state's sovereignty in the occupied territories.

Regions

Regions (mkhare) were established by presidential decrees from 1994 to 1996, on a provisional basis until the secessionist conflicts in Abkhazia and South Ossetia are resolved. They roughly correspond to the traditional principal historical and geographical areas of Georgia. A region is not a self-governing unit; its function is, rather, to coordinate communication of several municipalities (with the exception of the municipalities of Adjara and that of Tbilisi) with the central government of Georgia, which is represented in a region by an official appointed by Prime Minister, the State Commissioner, informally known as "governor".

Municipalities

According to the Georgian law, a municipality is a settlement or a group of settlement with defined borders and self-government. There are two types of municipalities—self-governing cities, five in total, and self-governing communities, 64 in total as of January 2019. The current municipalities were established between 2006 and 2017. Most of the municipalities recapitulate the boundaries and names of earlier subdivisions, known as raioni (district).

See also
 List of cities and towns in Georgia
 List of municipalities in Georgia (country)
 List of Georgian regions by Human Development Index
 ISO 3166-2 codes for regions and autonomous republics of Georgia

References 

 
Georgia
Georgia
Georgia (country) geography-related lists